Antispilina ludwigi is a moth of the Heliozelidae family. It is found in Germany, Poland and the Czech Republic.

The larvae feed on Persicaria bistorta. They mine the leaves of their host plant. The mine starts as a full depth blotch, which develops in all directions. There are mostly several of these blotches in a single leaf. The frass is granular and blackish green in colour. It is deposited in the middle of the mine. Full-grown larvae make a round or oval excision which they use to leave the mine by dropping to the ground, where pupation takes place. Larvae can be found in July.

References

Moths described in 1941
Heliozelidae
Moths of Europe